Jérémy Chardy (born 12 February 1987) is a French professional tennis player. He has won one ATP Tour singles title, in Stuttgart in 2009. His best Grand Slam performance in singles was reaching the quarterfinals of the 2013 Australian Open, and in doubles was reaching the final at the 2019 French Open with compatriot Fabrice Martin. He achieved a career-high ATP singles ranking of world No. 25 on 28 January 2013 and No. 24 on 3 February 2020 in doubles.

Tennis career

Juniors
Chardy won the 2005 Wimbledon Championships Boys' Singles title, and finished as the runner-up at the 2005 US Open Boys' Singles, losing to Ryan Sweeting.

As a junior Chardy compiled a 65–28 singles win–loss record and reached as high as No. 3 in the junior combined world rankings in September 2005.

2006–2008: Breaking into the top 100 of the ATP singles rankings
Chardy made his Grand Slam debut in 2006, receiving a wild card at the French Open, where he beat Jonas Björkman in straight sets in the first round, before losing in four sets to fifteenth-seeded David Ferrer in the second round.

In 2008, after losing the final of the Marrakech Challenger in May to eventual French Open semifinalist Gaël Monfils, Chardy produced his best Grand Slam showing until 2013 at the French Open, where he entered as a wild card and came back in the second round from two-sets-to-love down to defeat World No. 6 David Nalbandian in five sets (only dropping 5 games in the final three sets). He continued his run by beating 30th seed Dmitry Tursunov, before losing in the fourth round to 19th seed Nicolás Almagro in straight sets (Chardy held set points in each of the three sets).

2009: First ATP World Tour singles title

In 2009, he began with a first-round loss in Doha, before reaching the quarterfinals in Sydney, where he fell to Richard Gasquet. At the Australian Open, he fell in the second round to defending champion Novak Djokovic.

In his next tournament at Johannesburg, he reached the semifinals, following three straight-sets wins. In the semifinals, he came up against World No. 13 David Ferrer and saved three match points in the second set to win in a final set tiebreak, and reach his first ATP final. Chardy lost in the final to Jo-Wilfried Tsonga.

He lost in the opening round of his next tournament, the 2009 Open 13 in Marseille, to Novak Djokovic. In Delray Beach, he was seeded seventh and defeated Tommy Haas, Andrey Golubev and Marcos Baghdatis. He fell in the semifinals to top seed and eventual winner, Mardy Fish.

Chardy frequently plays doubles with compatriot Gilles Simon. They most recently competed at the Monte-Carlo Masters together, losing to Nikolay Davydenko and Oliver Marach in the first round.

At Wimbledon, Chardy lost in the first round in four sets to eventual runner-up Andy Roddick.

Next, Chardy played at the MercedesCup in Stuttgart. He defeated José Acasuso, Martín Vassallo Argüello and local hopes Mischa Zverev and Nicolas Kiefer, on the same day to reach his second career final. He triumphed over fourth-seeded Victor Hănescu (after losing the first set 1–6) to clinch his maiden ATP World Tour singles title.

2010: First Masters singles quarterfinal
At the beginning of the 2010 season, he started poorly; losing in the first rounds of the Brisbane International, Heineken Open, the Australian Open, and the SAP Open. However, he finally registered his first win in the tour, at the 2010 Regions Morgan Keegan Championships in style, as he beat second seed Fernando Verdasco in the first round. This was arguably his best win to date and only his fourth win against a top-10 player. At the 2010 Rogers Cup, Chardy defeated Verdasco once more in the second round and followed this up with an easy win over sixth-ranked Nikolay Davydenko in the round of 16, before losing to Novak Djokovic in the quarterfinals.

2011: Madrid Challenger singles title
In 2011, Chardy played principally in Challenger tournaments, reaching several finals, both in singles and in doubles. He qualified for the Kremlin Cup and reached the semifinals, where he was defeated by Victor Troicki.

2012: 100th career singles win, top 30 debut
In the 2012 Western and Southern Open in Cincinnati, Jérémy Chardy upset the defending champion and Olympic singles gold medalist Andy Murray in straight sets. Murray had easily beaten him the last four times he faced Chardy. Jérémy was defeated by Juan Martín del Potro in the quarterfinals, in straight sets.

2013: First Major quarterfinal & career-high ranking in singles 
Chardy started the year impressively, reaching the quarter-finals of the 2013 Australian Open. Along the way he defeated three seeded players: 30th seed Marcel Granollers (6–3, 3–6, 6–1, 6–2), 6th seed Juan Martín del Potro in five sets (6–3, 6–3, 6–7, 3–6, 6–3), and 21st seed Andreas Seppi from a set down (5–7, 6–3, 6–2, 6–2). In the quarter-finals he was beaten by World No. 2 Andy Murray in straight sets (6–4, 6–1, 6–2). This run propelled Chardy to a career-high singles ranking of World No. 25. He lost in the third round of the French Open, to countryman Jo-Wilfried Tsonga. He also lost in the third round of Wimbledon to Novak Djokovic, winning just seven games.

2014–2016: 150th career singles win and first Masters singles semifinal
In 2014 Chardy capped off 2014 recording 33 wins and 27 losses in singles. He registered his 150th career singles win at the 2014 Wimbledon Championships.

In 2015, Chardy reached his first Masters semifinal after saving seven match points against John Isner in the Rogers Cup quarter-finals, before losing to world no.1 Novak Djokovic 6–4,6–4 in the semifinals. As the no. 30 seed, Chardy lost in the 3rd round of the 2016 French Open to third-seeded Stan Wawrinka in straight sets.

2019–2020: French Open & Rome Masters Doubles finalist
At the 2019 French Open, Chardy, partnered with Fabrice Martin, reached the final, losing to unseeded German pair Kevin Krawietz and Andreas Mies in straight sets.

Again partnering with Martin, Chardy reached the final of the 2020 Rome Masters, where the pair lost to Marcel Granollers and Horacio Zeballos.

2021–22: Two ATP 250 semifinals & 500 quarterfinals, back to top 50, Olympics, hiatus
Chardy began his 2021 season by reaching the semifinals of Antalya and Melbourne 2, where he lost to Alexander Bublik and Dan Evans, respectively.

At the Australian Open, he lost to eventual champion Novak Djokovic in the first round in straight sets.

At Rotterdam, Chardy reached the quarterfinals, upsetting 6th seed David Goffin along the way. He lost to 4th seed Andrey Rublev in a tightly contested 3 set match.

For a second time he reached the quarterfinals of an ATP 500 tournament at the Dubai Championships upsetting two seeded players Alex De Minaur and Karen Khachanov before losing to a third seeded player Denis Shapovalov. Because of this successful run and achieving good results, Chardy returned to the top 50 in two years, at the end of March.

After 10 years of absence and in only his third participation, Chardy reached the third round of the 2021 Wimbledon Championships in doubles for the first time in his career partnering with Fabrice Martin after the retirement of their compatriots Nicolas Mahut and Pierre-Hugues Herbert in the second round.

Chardy also reached the quarterfinals in the Olympics, beating Tomás Barrios, Aslan Karatsev and Liam Broady. He lost to Alexander Zverev in the quarterfinals.

On 23 September 2021, Chardy suspended his season, saying he suffered an adverse reaction to a COVID-19 vaccination, and was unable to train or play.

He begin coaching compatriot Ugo Humbert in July 2022.

Performance timelines

Singles
Current through the 2021 US Open.

Doubles

Significant finals

Grand Slam tournament finals

Doubles: 1 (1 runner-up)

Masters 1000 finals

Doubles: 1 (1 runner-up)

ATP Tour finals

Singles: 3 (1 title, 2 runner-up)

Doubles: 17 (7 titles, 10 runners-up)

ATP Challenger Tour and ITF finals

Singles: 13 (7 titles, 6 runner–ups)

Doubles: 5 (2 titles, 3 runner–ups)

Junior Grand Slam finals

Singles: 2 (1 title, 1 runner-up)

Doubles: 1 (1 runner-up)

Record against other players

Record against top 10 players
Chardy's match record against those who have been ranked in the top 10, with those who have been No. 1 in boldface

  John Isner 4–0
  Pablo Carreño Busta 4–2
  Gilles Simon 4–4
  Marcos Baghdatis 3–1
  Fernando Verdasco 3–2
  Ernests Gulbis 3–3
  Marin Čilić 3–4
  Richard Gasquet 3–5
  Mario Ančić 2–0
  Nicolas Kiefer 2–0
  Lucas Pouille 2–0
  Diego Schwartzman 2–0
  Daniil Medvedev 2–1
  Roberto Bautista Agut 2–2
  Jürgen Melzer 2–2
  Grigor Dimitrov 2–4
  Fabio Fognini 2–4
  Juan Mónaco 2–6
  David Ferrer 2–7
  Jonas Björkman 1–0
  James Blake 1–0
  Radek Štěpánek 1–0
  Nikolay Davydenko 1–1
  Karen Khachanov 1–1
  David Nalbandian 1–1
  Mardy Fish 1–2
  David Goffin 1–2
  Tommy Haas 1–2
  Gaël Monfils 1–2
  Tommy Robredo 1–2
  Mikhail Youzhny 1–2
  Kevin Anderson 1–3
  Juan Martín del Potro 1–3
  Andy Roddick 1–3
  Andrey Rublev 1–3
  Stefanos Tsitsipas 1–3
  Roger Federer 1–4
  Janko Tipsarević 1–4
  Jo-Wilfried Tsonga 1–4
  Nicolás Almagro 1–5
  Tomáš Berdych 1–5
  Alexander Zverev 1–5
  Andy Murray 1–9
  Arnaud Clément 0–1
  Fernando González 0–1
  Ivan Ljubičić 0–1
  Rainer Schüttler 0–1
  Dominic Thiem 0–1
  Matteo Berrettini 0–2
  Robin Söderling 0–2
  Lleyton Hewitt 0–3
  Rafael Nadal 0–3
  Jack Sock 0–3
  Denis Shapovalov 0–4
  Milos Raonic 0–7
  Stan Wawrinka 0–7
  Novak Djokovic 0–14

*.

Wins over top-10 players
He has a  record against players who were, at the time the match was played, ranked in the top ten.

Notes

References

External links

 
 
 Jeremy Chardy: I regret getting vaccinated, I have series of problems now, Tennis World

1987 births
Living people
French male tennis players
Sportspeople from Pau, Pyrénées-Atlantiques
Wimbledon junior champions
Grand Slam (tennis) champions in boys' singles
Olympic tennis players of France
Tennis players at the 2020 Summer Olympics